Wagnerispina is a lower Carboniferous proetid trilobite.

Etymology 

Wagnerispina was described from material found in England. The specimen shown is from the same location.

Distribution 
Wagnerispina is found across Europe in lower carboniferous deposits and has been collected for example from (Visian) deposits of SW England and the Czech republic.

Taxonomy 
Identified as proetid trilobite from the lower Visean (Chadian substage) Coddon Hill formation by Woodward 1902.

References

External links 

 Early Visean trilobites
 Lower Carboniferous Trilobites from the UK

Carboniferous animals
Proetidae
Proetida genera
Fossil taxa described in 1977